Hypsideres curvinucha is a species of beetle in the family Cerambycidae, and the only species in the genus Hypsideres. It was described by Karl Jordan in 1903.

References

Pachystolini
Beetles described in 1903
Taxa named by Karl Jordan